The Clement L. Hirsch Stakes is a Grade I American Thoroughbred horse race for fillies and mares age three years and older over a distance of one and one-sixteenth miles on the dirt track, scheduled annually in late July or early August at Del Mar Racetrack in Del Mar, California. The event currently carries a purse of $300,000.

History

The event was inaugurated as the Chula Vista Handicap on July 17, 1937, as a five and one-half furlong race for two-year-olds bred in California and was won by High Strike owned by singer Bing Crosby. The event was held again until 1967 when it was run at a distance of one mile.

In 1973, the race was brought back permanently as a contest for horses aged three and older at a distance of  miles on the turf. During the next few years there would be more distance changes.
It was run at  miles in 1973, 1 mile in 1974–1975, and seven and one-half furlongs from 1976–1980, after which it was set at its current distance of  miles.

In 1981 the event was moved to the dirt and the events conditions changed to the current restriction of fillies and mares that are three-years-old and older. Since then it has been run on the dirt except from 2007 to 2014 when Del Mar used a synthetic "all weather" surface.
 
In 2000 it was renamed to honor Clement L. Hirsch (1914–2000), a Thoroughbred owner whose horse, Magical Maiden won this race in 1993. A Newport Beach, California businessman, Hirsch was responsible for the creation of the Oak Tree Racing Association.

The race was run in two divisions in 1977 and again in 1980.

The event was classified as Grade III in 1983, upgraded to Grade II in 1986 and a Grade I event in 2009. At the same time, conditions for the event changed from a handicap to a stakes format.

In the 1980s when this event became a fillies and mares race it started to attract high calibre performers that would confirm the status of the event. Starting in 1984 with the winner Princess Rooney who later that year would win the Breeders' Cup Distaff and be crowned US Champion Older Dirt Female Horse. The 1990 winner, the Argentine bred mare Bayakoa would rectify her unplaced finish from 1989 and would also win the Breeders' Cup Distaff for the second time and retain her position as US Champion Older Dirt Female Horse. Allen E. Paulson's two-time winner of the event, Azeri would become US Horse of the Year in 2002. Zenyatta proved her dominance in this event winning it three times and with that she continued on winning the 2009 Breeders' Cup Classic and in 2010 becoming US Horse of the Year.

Records
Speed record: 
: 1:40.00 – Matching (1982) (new stakes and track record)

Speed record: 
7 lengths – Beholder (2015)

Most wins:
 3 – Zenyatta (2008, 2009, 2010)

Most wins by a jockey:
 7 – Chris McCarron (1981, 1988, 1994, 1995, 1996, 1997, 2000)

Most wins by a trainer:
 5 – John W. Sadler (2006, 2014, 2016, 2017, 2019)

Most wins by an owner:
 3 – Sidney Craig (1992, 1994, 1996)
 3 – Jerry and Ann Moss (2008, 2009, 2010)
 3 – Hronis Racing (2014, 2016, 2017)

Winners

Legend:

 
 
 

Notes:

§ Ran as an entry

† In the 1937 the event was restricted to two year olds bred in California

See also
List of American and Canadian Graded races

External links
 2020 Del Mar Media Guide

References

Del Mar Racetrack
Horse races in California
Breeders' Cup Challenge series
Grade 1 stakes races in the United States
Mile category horse races for fillies and mares
Recurring sporting events established in 1937
1937 establishments in California